A tacksman (meaning "supporting man"; most common Scots spelling: takisman) was a landholder of intermediate legal and social status in Scottish Highland society.

Tenant and landlord
Although a tacksman generally paid a yearly rent for the land let to him (his "tack"), his tenure might last for several generations. He would often be related to his landlord and might, for example, represent a cadet branch of the family of the clan chief. The tacksman in turn would let out his land to sub-tenants, but he might keep some in hand himself.
Dr Johnson defined the class in this manner:

The three fundamental obligations traditionally imposed on tacksmen were grassum (a premium payable on entering into a lease), rental (either in kind, or in money, which was designated "tack-duty"), and the rendering of military service.

Inheritance
As described by James Mitchell:

This system began to break down by the early 18th century. In 1737, Archibald Campbell, 3rd Duke of Argyll decreed that tacks were to be let out to the highest bidder rather than being given to a tacksman with family connections, consequently many of the older sort of tacksmen were dispossessed. Because they mustered the tenants, acted as officers and functioned as shock troops in time of war, Argyll had inadvertently weakened his military position and that of the Hanoverians in the 1745 Jacobite Rising.

However, his rival Donald Cameron of Lochiel maintained the old arrangements with tacksmen. As a consequence the Camerons—who sided with the Jacobites—possessed an enhanced potential to take a military initiative.

Reputation
The tacksman’s reputation was an ambiguous one. To some, he appeared to be no more than a parasitic middleman, but Dr Johnson mounted a stout defence:

Decline
The class of tacksmen was most prominent in the 17th and 18th centuries. The Highland Clearances destroyed the tacksman system – perhaps more thoroughly than they did the crofters – and many tacksmen emigrated to the New World.

Notable tacksmen
Flora MacDonald was a notable and characteristic member of the tacksman class. She was the daughter of Ranald MacDonald, who held the tack of Milton in South Uist from the chief of Clanranald, and she married Allan MacDonald, who held the tack of Kingsburgh from the Chief of Clan MacDonald of Sleat. She and her husband emigrated to North Carolina in 1773. After siding with King George III of Great Britain during the American War of Independence, Flora and her husband were forced to move, first to Nova Scotia, and then back to Scotland. She had numerous sons.
Aonghas Beag MacDonald, the older brother of the Scottish Gaelic Bard Alasdair mac Mhaighstir Alasdair, held the tack of Dalilea from the Chief of Clanranald.

References

Further reading
T. C. Smout, A History of the Scottish People 1560–1830 (London, 1969)

External links
Encyclopædia Britannica, Volume 11 (1823), at page   648

History of the Scottish Highlands